Dhivya Suryadevara is an Indian-American executive and the current chief financial officer of Stripe, an American e-commerce payments company. She is the former Executive Vice President and Chief Financial Officer of General Motors.

Early life and education
Suryadevara was brought up in Chennai, India along with two sisters by her mother, who worked in Syndicate Bank in Chennai.

Suryadevara studied in St John's Senior Secondary School in Mandaveli, Chennai. She did her bachelor's degree in commerce from the Ethiraj College for Women of the University of Madras.
She later went on to pursue Chartered Accountancy at the Institute of Chartered Accountants of India. She is also a chartered financial analyst, and has an MBA from Harvard Business School.

Career
Suryadevara started her career at PricewaterhouseCoopers while attending the University of Madras. She then interned at the World Bank in 2002 and went on to UBS as an investment banker. She joined General Motors in 2004. In 2013, she was appointed the CFO and chief investment officer of GM Asset Management. In 2015, she accepted a role as Vice President of Finance and Treasurer. In 2017, she became the first female Chief Financial Officer at General Motors.

On August 13, 2020, Suryadevara resigned her position as chief financial officer at General Motors to work as Chief Financial Officer for e-commerce payments company, Stripe.

Suryadevara was named to Fortune's 40 Under 40 in 2015 and 2018.

References

Living people
Women chief financial officers
University of Madras alumni
Indian accountants
Ethiraj College for Women alumni
Harvard Business School alumni
Year of birth missing (living people)
CFA charterholders
General Motors people
Chief investment officers